Zohre River (Persian: رودخانه زهره; zohre translates as 'Venus' ) is a river in southwestern Iran. It is formed at the confluence of the rivers Rudkhaneye-Fekhlian, and Rude-Tenge-Shu, which flow from the southern slopes of the Zagros mountains northwest of the city of Nurabad, Fars to the south-west of Yasuj, in the Fars province. The stream rises at an altitude of approximately 2450 m, and flows in the east-west direction for 490 km.

It flows into the Persian Gulf of the Indian Ocean 25 km southwest of Hendijan, in the southeast of Khuzestan, where it forms the Hendijan Delta.

Tributaries 
Tributaries of the Zohreh River‎ are Fahlian River, and Kheyrabad River. The catchment area of the Zohreh is about 17 150 km2; of these 14 100 km2 is mountainous. The rest of the catchment consists of plains and mountainous foothills.

Antiquity 
In antiquity it was called Arosis (ancient Greek Ἄροσις, Latin Arosis, also Zarotis, Oratis, Oroatis). The river represented the border of the ancient territories of Parsa (Persides), and Susiana.

At the mouth of the river, the fleet of Nearchus (360–300 BC), an associate of Alexander the Great, stopped to rest and to take on water for five days to sail along the shores of Susiana.

The town of Alexandria Carmania was founded by Alexander in January 324 BC after his army had reunited with Nearchus and his men who had beached their boats near the mouth of the Minab River, further down along the south coast of Iran in Hormozgan province.

Archaeology 

The Zohreh Prehistoric Project is a long-term archaeological study program launched in 2015, and focusing on the Zohreh River plain. The research continues in the area south of the modern city of Behbahan in Khuzestan Province. This area was inhabited at the end of the fifth and beginning of the fourth millennia BC. The principal ancient site being excavated is Tol-e Chega Sofla, also known as Chogha Sofla.

To the north, the Behbahan plain, intersected by Marun River, is also a closely associated area.

See also
Karun River
List of rivers of Iran
Helleh River
Mond River
Mehran River
Minab River

References

Literature
 
 
 Falcon, N.L. (1947). Raised beaches and terraces of the Iranian Makran coast. Geographical Journal, 109, 149–151.
 Gharibreza, M., Habibi, A., Imamjomeh, S.R., & Ashraf, M.A. (2014). Coastal processes and sedimentary facies in the Zohreh River Delta (Northern Persian Gulf). CATENA, 122, 150–158.
 Jamab, E.C. (1999). Iran integrated water plan, Zohreh River watershed. In W. Research (Ed.) Tehran: Ministry of Energy.

External links
 Zohreh River, Zohre, Hendijan Iran Travel Information
 
 

Kohgiluyeh and Boyer-Ahmad Province
Rivers of Iran
Rivers of Khuzestan Province
Rivers of Chaharmahal and Bakhtiari province
Fars Province